Dirty Laundry is a 2006 drama film written, directed, and starring Maurice Jamal. It was produced by 20th Century Fox Home Entertainment and distributed by Codeblack Entertainment. It is available on DVD and is rated PG-13.

Plot
After ten years, Sheldon returns from New York City to Paris, Georgia. His mother is Evelyn, a laundress who is stubborn, ornery, opinionated, mean-spirited, insulting, and inflexible. Evelyn sends a ten-year-old boy claiming to be Sheldon's son to see Sheldon. Sheldon comes home to resolve the matter. Old arguments reignite between himself, his mother, his sister, and his brother.

Sheldon disputes that the boy is his son. He does not want to be a part of fatherhood or family. Then, a white man from New York arrives at Evelyn's door, claiming to be Sheldon's partner

Cast
Rockmond Dunbar as Sheldon
Loretta Devine as Evelyn
Jenifer Lewis as Aunt Lettuce
Terri J. Vaughn as Jackie
Maurice Jamal as Eugene
Sommore as Abby
Joey Costello as Ryan
Aaron Grady Shaw as Gabriel
Rainey Mathews as Pudge
Bobby Jones as Pastor James
Leigh Taylor-Young as Mrs. James
Gregory Alan Williams as Percy
Alec Mapa as Daniel
Veronica Webb as Susan
Erica Watson as Clarine
Tony Vaughn as Auntie's Husband
Chad Hawkins as Auntie's Rapping Son
Dottie Peoples as Sister in Congregation 
Austin Whittaker as Young Sheldon
Markelle Gay as Young Eugene
Renee White Davis as Willa
Tanya Shields as Bertie Mae
Denita Isler as Norma Jean
Clay Drinko as Bradley
La Rivers as Tanya Elise
Nathan Hale as Peanut
Kate Secor as Liz
Andrei Claude as Bartender

References

External links 
 

2006 films
African-American drama films
2006 drama films
2000s English-language films
2000s American films